James Couper (9 August 1752 – 7 August 1836) was a Scottish astronomer. He was Professor of Astronomy at the University of Glasgow from 1803 to 1836.

Life
Couper was Professor of Astronomy at the University of Glasgow from 1803 to 1836.  He also held other positions within the university including:
 Dean of Faculties 1800–1801
 Clerk of Senate from 1810 to 1814, 1820 to 1828
 keeper of the Hunterian Museum (a joint position with his sons)

He taught very little Astronomy and abandoned observations because of the increasing smoke and new buildings in the surrounding areas of the observatory.  He seemed not to have considered building a new observatory outside the town.

Couper was a student at the University of Glasgow and graduated Master of Arts in 1775, and Doctor of Divinity in 1800. He became minister of Baldernock Parish Church in 1783 until his appointment to the Regius Chair of Astronomy in 1803. In November 1813 Couper took on responsibility for teaching Hebrew when the then Professor of Oriental Languages became ill.

He is buried in Ramshorn Cemetery on Ingram Street in Glasgow. The grave lies on the western wall of the main eastern entrance, close to where the cemetery widens.

Minister
Couper became minister of Baldernock Parish Church, East Renfrewshire, in 1783. In 1795, the present Church building was constructed during his tenure. Couper wrote in his first Statistical Account; "The greater part of the inhabitants of this parish devote their time to that most innocent and most useful of secular employments, the cultivation of the earth".

The "living" received by Couper in 1783 consisted of "63 bolls of meal, £331 in money. a manse and a Glebe of 10 acres whereof seven are arable".

Family
James Couper married Margaret Thomson on 11 November 1783. They had seven children; 

 John Couper, b. 16 January 1785, d.(date unknown)
 Rev. James Couper, MA, b. 17 August 1786, d. 29 March 1822
 Sarah Couper, b. 5 April 1788, d.(date unknown)
 Robert Thomson Couper, b. 6 January 1790, d. 4 February 1803
 William Couper, MD, b. 30 April 1792, d. 4 August 1857
 Henry Glassford Couper, b. 20 May 1793, d. 27 October 1800
 Henry Couper, b. 20 September 1801, d.(date unknown)

References

External links
 University of Glasgow Story; People; James Couper
 Family Research, Community Trees, Rev James Couper

1752 births
1836 deaths
18th-century British astronomers
18th-century Scottish scientists
Academics of the University of Glasgow
Scottish astronomers
18th-century Ministers of the Church of Scotland
19th-century Ministers of the Church of Scotland